The Harrisburg Mall is a regional mall located just outside Harrisburg in Swatara Township, Pennsylvania.  It is the largest mall in the Harrisburg metropolitan area. The anchor store is Bass Pro Shops. There are 2 vacant anchor stores that were once Macy's and Boscov's.

History
The mall, formerly known as the Harrisburg East Mall, opened in 1969 with JCPenney, Wanamaker's, and Gimbels as anchors.  During construction a natural limestone cave known variously as Big Pit, Paxtang or Crystal Paradise Cave known for its anthodite and speleothem formations was uncovered.

In 1978, Gimbels closed, due to poor sales at the location as well as its distance from the other stores in the chain which made it unprofitable.  Hess's opened in that space later the same year.

In 1994, Hess's closed, due to the company's merge with other stores. Hecht's, being one of them, opened immediately after.

In 1999, Wanamaker's closed, and Lord & Taylor opened a year later.

In 2001, JCPenney closed, and Boscov's opened in that space in 2003.

In 2004, A $77 million revitalization of the mall which, in addition to renovations to the mall's decor, included the addition of a 14-screen Great Escape theater and entertainment complex on the southwest corner of the mall. The last phase of the renovation was planned to be completed in 2008 with a brand new "streetscape" look on the north side of the mall. However, the addition remained uncompleted in 2009, due in part to changing market conditions, as well financial difficulties with the mall's owner, Feldman Mall Properties. All three of these stores were abandoned in an unfinished state.

In 2004, Lord & Taylor closed, and Bass Pro Shops opened later that year, after a two floor expansion of the building was built, and the Wanamaker's third floor was made private.

In 2006, Hecht's was converted to Macy's due to Macy's parent company (Federated Department Stores) having acquired Hecht's parent company (May Department Stores) in 2005.

In 2008, Boscov's filed for Chapter 11 Bankruptcy, causing 10 stores to close, the Harrisburg Mall location being one of them. The building has been vacant since.

On July 9, 2009, the Harrisburg Mall was sold at sheriffs sale to three financial groups after the previous owner, Feldman Lubert Adler defaulted on a $52.5 million mortgage. In June 2012, Harrisburg Mall was purchased from TD Bank by Maryland-based commercial real estate developers St. John Properties and Petrie Ross Ventures, who collectively own or have developed over 25 million sq. ft. of commercial property in six states.

The Sega Sports Restaurant space was demolished in mid-2012. In 2013, Books-A-Million opened a 2nd & Charles store in the spot originally slated for Barnes & Noble.

On January 6, 2020, it was announced that Macy's would be closing in March 2020 as part of a plan to close 125 stores nationwide. After Macy's closed, Bass Pro Shops is the only anchor store left.

Anchors

Current
 Bass Pro Shops - Opened 2004

Former
 Gimbels - Opened 1969, closed 1978.
 Wanamaker's - Opened 1969, closed 1999.
 JCPenney - Opened 1969, closed 2001.
 Hess's - Opened 1978, closed 1994.
 Hecht's - Opened 1994, closed 2006.
 Lord & Taylor - Opened 2000, closed 2004. 
 Boscov's - Opened 2003, closed 2008.
 Macy's - Opened 2006, closed 2020

References

External links

 Harrisburg Mall
 Feldman Mall Properties

Shopping malls in Harrisburg, Pennsylvania
Shopping malls established in 1969
1969 establishments in Pennsylvania